The chick syncytial virus is a virus in the genus Gammaretrovirus.

References 

Gammaretroviruses